Hugo Island (or Víctor Hugo) is an isolated ice-covered island  long, with several rocky islets and pinnacles off its east side, located off the west side of the Antarctic Peninsula, about  southwest of Cape Monaco, Anvers Island. It was probably discovered by C.J. Evensen, captain of the Peninsula in 1893, because an unnamed island of similar extent and location first appeared on the charts at that time. The island was charted by the French Antarctic Expedition, 1903–05, under Dr. J.B. Charcot, who named it for the French poet and novelist Victor Hugo, grandfather of Charcot's first wife, whose maiden name was Jeanne Hugo.

See also 
 List of Antarctic and sub-Antarctic islands
 Phelps Rock

References

Islands of Graham Land
Landforms of Graham Land